Eve Egoyan (born 1964) is an Armenian-Canadian pianist and artist based in Toronto.

Early life and education 

Egoyan was born in Victoria, British Columbia. Her Armenian parents, Shushan and Joseph, both painters, ran an art gallery/furniture store in Cairo, Egypt, before emigrating to Canada in 1962. Shushan and Joseph settled in Victoria, where they took over a home furnishings/design store.

Egoyan's parents didn't own a piano, but as a young girl she began to see the piano as a “safe, private place”. Egoyan took lessons from an elderly neighbour, and then began formal lessons at 11 at the Victoria Conservatory of Music. She went on to study piano in Banff with György Sebők, in Berlin with Georg Sava, in London with Hamish Milne, and at the University of Toronto with Patricia Parr, where she completed a master's degree in 1992.

Music career 

Egoyan specializes in new works for the piano. Canadian composer Ann Southam dedicated several works to Egoyan throughout the late 1990s and early 2000s including: Qualities of Consonance (1998), Figures: Music for Piano and String Orchestra (2001), In Retrospect (2004), and Simple Lines of Enquiry (2008).

Her 12 solo CDs explore music by composers ranging from Erik Satie to Alvin Curran, Michael Finnissy, James Tenney, Martin Arnold, Linda Catlin Smith, and Southam. Her most recent album, De Puro Amor & En Amor Duro, features two large-scale works by Spanish-German composer Maria de Alvear.

In Surface Tension, a piece created in collaboration with media artist David Rokeby, Egoyan's performance is translated by Rokeby's software into images projected on a screen above the piano. Changes in dynamics, pitch, tone and duration trigger visuals based on natural processes like the motion of planets, the swarming of insects, and water ripples created by a falling pebble.

In 2018, Egoyan created Solo for Duet, an integrated mix of sound, image, and unspoken narrative challenging traditional conceptions of piano and pianist. The following year she collaborated with director Su Rynard on a 72-minute portrait film, Duet for Solo Piano, that documents this musical exploration.
 
Egoyan's current focus is composing and performing her own work for augmented piano – an acoustic piano equipped with computer software to extend, expand, and enhance the sound.

Egoyan has been the recipient of several accolades including "Best Classical" by The Globe and Mail (1999) for her first solo CD; one of "Ten Top" classical discs, by The New Yorker magazine (2009); and "Top Classical Disc of the Year", by The Globe and Mail (2011). In 2013, she received a Chalmers Arts Fellowship. In 2019, the CBC named her one of the “best 25 Canadian classical pianists of all time”. She won the Muriel Sherrin Award from the Toronto Arts Foundation in 2019.

She has performed in Canada, the US, Europe, and Japan, including festivals in Italy (Transart), Austria (Klangspuren), the UK (Huddersfield Festival), and Vancouver (Modulus Festival). She is a Fellow of the Royal Society of Canada (FRSC) and has been designated a CMC Ambassador by the Canadian Music Centre. Egoyan is an elected Associate of the Royal Academy of Music, London, England (ARAM).

Personal life 

Egoyan is married to David Rokeby, a media artist. Her older brother, Atom Egoyan, is a Canadian filmmaker.

Discography
Selected solo recordings:
 (2016) Maria de Alvear's diptych De Puro Amor and En Amor Duro 
 (2015) "Thought and Desire" (Earwitness Editions and World Edition)
 (2013), 5 (Centrediscs)
 (2011), RETURNINGS, (Centrediscs)
 (2009), Simple Lines of Enquiry (Centrediscs)
 (2007), Asking (Mode Records, New York)
 (2006), Weave (Earwitness Records)
 (2005), WU by Rudolf Komorous (Candereen Records)
 (2004), The Art of Touching the Keyboard (Earwitness Records)
 (2001), Recoins (Hidden Corners) (CBC Records)
 (1999), thethingsinbetween (Artifact Music)

Notes

References 
 Sykes, C. (2000). Dreaming into the work: The interpretive piano art of Eve Egoyan. Musicworks, (77), 11–14.
 This is how a listener plays: New music pianist Eve Egoyan pays attention to every detail, including the silences [New Music for Piano: Thethingsinbetween]. (1999, October 26). National Post, B1,B3.
 "Eve Egoyan: musical explorer: [Ontario Edition]", Toronto Star (7 March 2002), H05.

External links 
 
 CBC Music
 Duet for Solo Piano

Canadian women pianists
Fellows of the Royal Society of Canada
Living people
University of Toronto alumni
University of Victoria alumni
21st-century Canadian pianists
21st-century Canadian women musicians
1964 births
21st-century women pianists